Morsko  is a village in the administrative district of Gmina Krosno Odrzańskie, within Krosno Odrzańskie County, Lubusz Voivodeship, in western Poland.

The village has a population of 30.

References

Morsko